

143001–143100 

|-id=048
| 143048 Margaretpenston ||  || Margaret Penston (born 1941), the past president of the Society for Popular Astronomy based in the United Kingdom || 
|}

143101–143200 

|-bgcolor=#f2f2f2
| colspan=4 align=center | 
|}

143201–143300 

|-bgcolor=#f2f2f2
| colspan=4 align=center | 
|}

143301–143400 

|-bgcolor=#f2f2f2
| colspan=4 align=center | 
|}

143401–143500 

|-bgcolor=#f2f2f2
| colspan=4 align=center | 
|}

143501–143600 

|-id=579
| 143579 Dérimiksa ||  || Miksa Déri (1854–1938), a Hungarian electrical engineer. || 
|}

143601–143700 

|-id=622
| 143622 Robertbloch || 2003 HG || Robert Bloch (1922–1994), a Swiss art, literature and music benefactor, founder of the "Fondation Anne et Robert Bloch" || 
|-id=641
| 143641 Sapello ||  || Sapello, New Mexico || 
|}

143701–143800 

|-bgcolor=#f2f2f2
| colspan=4 align=center | 
|}

143801–143900 

|-bgcolor=#f2f2f2
| colspan=4 align=center | 
|}

143901–144000 

|-bgcolor=#f2f2f2
| colspan=4 align=center | 
|}

References 

143001-144000